Hexachlorobutadiene, (often abbreviated as "HCBD") Cl2C=C(Cl)C(Cl)=CCl2, is a colorless liquid at room temperature that has an odor similar to that of turpentine.  It is a chlorinated aliphatic diene with niche applications but is most commonly used as a solvent for other chlorine-containing compounds.

Synthesis
Hexachlorobutadiene, or HCBD, is primarily produced in chlorinolysis plants as a by-product in the production of carbon tetrachloride and tetrachloroethene.  Chlorinolysis is a radical chain reaction that occurs when hydrocarbons are exposed to chlorine gas under pyrolytic conditions.  The hydrocarbon is chlorinated and the resulting chlorocarbons are broken down.  This process is analogous to combustion, but with chlorine instead of oxygen.

Hexachlorobutadiene occurs as a by-product during the chlorinolysis of butane derivatives in the production of both carbon tetrachloride and tetrachloroethene.  These two commodities are manufactured on such a large scale, that enough HCBD can generally be obtained to meet the industrial demand.  Alternatively, hexachlorobutadiene can be directly synthesized via the chlorination of butane or butadiene.

Reactivity
The products of chlorinolysis reactions heavily depend upon both the temperature and pressure under which the reaction occurs. Thus, by adjusting these reaction conditions in the presence of chlorine gas, hexachlorobutadiene can be even further chlorinated to give tetrachloroethylene, hexachloroethane, octachlorobutene, and even decachlorobutane.  In general, increasing the number of chlorine substituents on a compound increases its toxicity but decreases its combustibility.  Chlorination via carbon skeleton cleavage is thermodynamically preferred, whereas chlorinated C4 products are favored at lower temperatures and pressures.  The three chlorinolysis products of hexachlorobutadiene are shown in the reactions below.

Applications
One of the primary applications of hexachlorobutadiene is as a solvent for chlorine, a good example of the common aphorism "like dissolves like." The molar solubility of chlorine in HCBD at 0 °C is around 34% (2.17 mol/L).  The solubility of another chlorine solvent, carbon tetrachloride, at 0 °C is about 30% (3.11 mol/L).  One mole of C4Cl6 can dissolve more chlorine than one mole of CCl4, but the molecular weight difference between the two solvents is such that per liter of solvent, more chlorine can be dissolved in carbon tetrachloride.  Shown below is the molar solubility of hexachlorobutadiene compared to carbon tetrachloride at various temperatures. 

Just like chlorine, many other chlorine-containing compounds can be readily dissolved in a solution of hexachlorobutadiene. As a solvent, it is unreactive toward common acids and select non-nucleophilic bases. An illustrative application HCBD as a solvent is the FeCl3-catalyzed chlorination of toluene to give pentachloromethylbenzene.  Hexachlorobutadiene is used exclusively over carbon tetrachloride in this reaction because ferric chloride (FeCl3) is insoluble in CCl4.

Given its affinity for chlorinated compounds, liquid HCBD is used as a scrubber in order to remove chlorine containing contaminants from gas streams. An example of this application is its use in the production of HCl gas as the primary contaminants, especially Cl2, are more soluble in hexachlorobutadiene than the gaseous hydrogen chloride.

In IR spectroscopy, hexachlorobutadiene is occasionally used as a mull in order to analyze the  stretching frequencies of C-H stretching bands. The usual mulling agent, Nujol, is a hydrocarbon and thus exhibits C-H stretching bands that can interfere with the signal from the sample. Since HCBD contains no C-H bonds, it can be used instead to obtain this portion of the IR spectrum.  Unfortunately, some organometallic compounds react with HCBD, and therefore, care must be taken when selecting it as a mulling agent so as not to destroy the sample. 

Hexachlorobutadiene has yet another, albeit somewhat dated, application as an algicide in industrial cooling systems.  Although HCBD is a potent herbicide, in recent years, this particular application has been discouraged due to the high toxicity of the compound at low concentrations.

Toxicity

Hexachlorobutadiene has been observed to produce systemic toxicity following exposure via oral, inhalation, and dermal routes. Effects may included fatty liver degeneration, epithelial necrotizing nephritis, central nervous system depression and cyanosis.

The United States Environmental Protection Agency has classified hexachlorobutadiene as a group C Possible Human Carcinogen.  The American Conference of Governmental and Industrial Hygienists has classified hexachlorobutadiene as an A3 Confirmed Animal Carcinogen with Unknown Relevance to Humans. The National Institute for Occupational Safety and Health has set a recommended exposure limit at 0.02 ppm over an eight-hour workday.

See also
 Hexafluorobutadiene

References

Organochlorides
Halogenated solvents
Persistent organic pollutants under the Stockholm Convention
Conjugated dienes